The 2007–08 season was the 106th season in the history of Stade Rennais F.C. and the club's 14th consecutive season in the top flight of French football. In addition to the domestic league, Rennes participated in this season's editions of the Coupe de France and Coupe de la Ligue.

Competitions

Overall record

Ligue 1

League table

Results summary

Results by round

Matches

Coupe de France

Coupe de la Ligue

Statistics

Appearances and goals

|-
! colspan="14" style="background:#dcdcdc; text-align:center"| Goalkeepers

|-
! colspan="14" style="background:#dcdcdc; text-align:center"| Defenders

|-
! colspan="14" style="background:#dcdcdc; text-align:center"| Midfielders

|-
! colspan="14" style="background:#dcdcdc; text-align:center"| Forwards

|-

References

Stade Rennais F.C. seasons
Rennes